Ukraine–Tajikistan relations refers to the bilateral diplomatic relations between Ukraine and the Republic of Tajikistan. Diplomatic relations were established on April 24, 1993. Bilateral relations are based on a Treaty of Friendship and Cooperation between the Republic of Tajikistan and Ukraine, signed on July 6, 2001. Tajik students have been trained in higher educational institutions of Ukraine.

Economic cooperation 
Ukrainian enterprises, companies and organizations have participated in the implementation of hydropower development, the construction of transmission lines, and the establishment of joint ventures in the oil and gas industries. In 2009, the Joint Intergovernmental Ukrainian-Tajik Commission for Economic Cooperation was established, where agreements in the trade, economic, energy, transport and humanitarian spheres take place.

Ambassadors

Ambassadors of Ukraine in Tajikistan 
 Safar Safarov (2001–2007)
 Abdulmajid Dostiev (2008–2010)
 Shukhrat Sultonov (2010–2015)
 Faizullo Kholboboev (2015–present)

High-level visits

See also 
 Foreign relations of Tajikistan
 Foreign relations of Ukraine

References 

 
Ukraine
Bilateral relations of Ukraine